The Colombian Naval Infantry, also referred to as Colombian Marines, is the marine force of the Colombian National Armada. The 53,123-member  Colombian Marine Infantry is organized into a single division with four brigades (one amphibious assault brigade and three riverine brigades), each with several battalions plus numerous small security units.

History 

The Naval Infantry is a constituent part of the Navy whose origins date back to the wars of independence. Today's Colombian Marines trace their heritage and military traditions from the Gran Colombia Marine Corps raised in 1822, by orders of Major General Francisco de Paula Santander, with Captain Diego Antonio García, who was appointed commander of the 6th Marine Company raised that year, being appointed Commandant that October.

Raised by an order from President Dr. Alfonso López Pumarejo on January 12, 1937, The Colombian Marines started out as a 120-strong Marine Company, located on Naval Base Cartagena.

On March 8, 1940, the 1st Marine Battalion was raised, with three companies to cover Bolivar, Putumayo and the San Andres Islands, then in 1943 was assigned to Buenaventura, Barranquilla, Puerto Leguizamo and the eastern plains.

In 1944, a heavy weapons company was raised and the battalion was moved to facilities adjacent to the San Pedro Claver convent in Cartagena. With the advent of La Violencia, in 1952 the Marines were reassigned to the Eastern Naval Force due to the appearance of subversives in this area, and in a year, with the transfer of personnel from the National Army of Colombia, the number of personnel serving increased.

In July 1955, thanks to the instruction of officers and NCOs in the United States in the United States Naval Academy, The Basic School of the United States Marine Corps and the United States Marine Corps School of Infantry and the U.S. mission of the United States Marine Corps aimed for this effort, the Naval Infantry began training and forming its personnel for amphibious warfare operations.

On April 9, 1956, the Marine Corps Basic and Formation School was opened, headquartered at first in Turbaco (Bolivar), then moved to Carne (Cartagena) and is today currently located in Covenas.

By 1957, the Marine Fluvial Commands were officially raised with the first unit being called "Flotilla Avispa", and thus its formal foundation marked a new chapter in the Naval Infantry history, as the Fluvial Commands were mandated to secure the nation's inland waters.

On July 3, 1958, the Colombian Naval Academy had its first 8 Marine Second Lieutenants commissioned.

In 1964, the Marine Infantry Directoriate of the Navy was established and became the Naval Infantry Command in 1967, the very same year that, led by CPT Jaime Arias Arango and with the advice of the then Commandant, COL  Jorge Sánchez, the Marine Amphibious Commando specialty arm was officially introduced into the service.

Dates of importance to the Naval Infantry 

The Naval Infantry Training Base, based in Covenas, began its work in 1975, with its mission of training men and women to join the ranks of the Naval Infantry and to prepare to perform its duties of defending the territorial and maritime integrity of the Colombian nation through basic military training through its Instruction Battalions before moving to the regular units of the Naval Infantry nationwide.

Since January 15, 1984, the Naval Infantry is a designated principal combatant command of the Navy, with its primary responsibility being amphibious and seaborne defense of the maritime and land territories of the Republic.

Since then, the Marines have had several changes in line with the operational situation and public order in Colombia.

Personnel
The Colombian Marine Infantry fields approximately 22,000 personnel, among officers and Infantrymen, and it is by far the biggest Corps within the Navy.

Ranks & Insignias

The tables below display the rank structures and rank insignias for the Colombian Naval Infantry personnel.

As a general rule the Corps uses Army rank titles while keeping naval-style insignia.

Officer ranks

Other ranks

Organization
Source:

Marine Infantry Training Base 

Base de entrenamiento de infanteria de marina "BEIM" is located in a small town called Coveñas, Sucre Department, in the caribbean north of Colombia. It has 3 battalions for recruits' boot camp training called BINIM 1, BINIM2 and BINIM3 (BINIM, Batallón de Instrucción de Infantería de Marina). A 13-week training program is performed under supervision of the United States Naval Mission by a Gunnery Sergeant of the United States Marine Corps.

The BEIM also has an Specialists Center (CIEAN: Centro Internacional de Entrenamiento Anfibio), where professional marines and sub-officers (Coporals - Sergeants) receive special training courses: Drill instructor, Anti-explosives, Canine guide, Personal defense, Shooter and Water survival. The training in this center is also supervised by the Gunnery Sergeant of the US Naval Mission.

There is also the Batallón de Comando y Apoyo de IM Nº 6 (BACAIM6) in charge of the watch and security of the surrounding areas of the base and some sectors of the Sucre Department.

First Marine Infantry Brigade
Brigada de Infantería de Marina No.1
Is a minor operative unit with the main purpose of neutralizing narcoterrorism. Mainly operated in the Caribbean Region of Colombia, in the area of Montes de María.

 Batallón de Fusileros de I.M. N° 2
 Batallón de Fusileros de I.M. N° 3
 Batallón de Fusileros de I.M. N° 4
 Batallón de Contraguerrillas de I.M. N° 1
 Batallón de Contraguerrillas de I.M. N° 2
 Batallón de Comando Y Apoyo de I.M. N° 1

First Riverine Marine Infantry Brigade
Brigada Fluvial de Infantería de Marina No. 1

The First Fluvial Brigade of the Naval Infantry was founded with the main purpose of grouping the direction, organization and control of all fluvial units of the former Fluvial Fleet of Magdalena and the Oriente.

 Batallón Fluvial de I.M. No.20 Turbo – Antioquia
 Batallón Fluvial de I.M. No.30 Yati – Bolivar
 Batallón Fluvial de I.M. No.40 Puerto Carreño - Vichada
 Batallón Fluvial de I.M. No.50 Puerto Inirida – Guainia

Second Riverine Marine Infantry Brigade
Brigada Fluvial de Infantería de Marina No.2

The Second Fluvial Brigade of the Naval Infantry is based in Buenaventura, Valle del Cauca Department.

 Batallón de Asalto Fluvial de I.M. N° 1 Buenaventura-valle
 Batallón de Asalto Fluvial de I.M. N° 3 Bahia Solano - Choco
 Batallón de Asalto Fluvial de I.M. N° 4 Bahia Malaga – Valle
 Batallón Fluvial De Im N° 10 Guapi - Cauca
 Batallón Fluvial De Im N° 70 Tumaco – Nariño
 Batallón Fluvial De Im N° 80 Buenaventura-valle
 Batallón De Comando Y Apoyo De Im N° 3 Buenaventura-valle

Third Riverine Marine Infantry Brigade
Brigada Fluvial de Infantería de Marina No.3

The Third Fluvial Brigade of the Naval Infantry is based in Puerto Leguizamo, Putumayo Department.

 Batallón Fluvial de I.M. Nº 60 Puerto Leguízamo - Putumayo
 Batallón Fluvial de I.M. Nº 90 Tres Esquinas - Caquetá
 Batallón Fluvial de I.M. Nº 100 Barrancón - Guaviare
 Batallón de Asalto Fluvial I.M. Nº 2 Tres Esquinas - Caquetá

Riverine Task Group
 Grupo de Tarea Fluvial

The Fluvial Tasks Group is a minor operative unit created on February 16, 2004, to participate in the Joint Task Force OMEGA which participates in operations part of the Plan Patriota.

 Unidad De Tarea Fluvial del Caqueta. Tres Esquinas – Caqueta
 Unidad De Tarea Fluvial del Guaviare. San Jose Del Guaviare
 Batallón De Asalto Fluvial de I.M. N° 2. Tres Esquinas – Caqueta

Equipment

APCs 
 / BTR-80 Caribe - 8 In service

Hovercraft 
  Griffon 2000TD hovercraft - 8 in service.

Trucks 
  Navistar 7000MV - 42 In service 
 / Chevrolet NPR
 / Chevrolet Kodiak

Notes

References

External links

 Colombian Marines official site
 Colombian National Armada
 Colombia: Seguridad & Defensa
 Non official Military Forces Web Site (Colombia)

Colombian Navy
Marines